A list of films produced in the Soviet Union between 1930 and 1939:

1930s
 Soviet films of 1930
 Soviet films of 1931
 Soviet films of 1932
 Soviet films of 1933
 Soviet films of 1934
 Soviet films of 1935
 Soviet films of 1936
 Soviet films of 1937
 Soviet films of 1938
 Soviet films of 1939

See also 
 Cinema of the Soviet Union
 Censorship in the Soviet Union

Soviet
Films